This is a list of the main career statistics of professional British tennis player Laura Robson.

Career Achievements
Laura Robson won her first Olympic medal at the 2012 Summer Olympics in mixed doubles alongside Andy Murray. At the 2012 US Open, she recorded the two biggest wins of her career over former Grand Slam champions Li Na and Kim Clijsters, before falling in the fourth round to Samantha Stosur. Robson reached her first WTA Tour singles final that same year in Guangzhou, losing to Hsieh Su-wei.

In 2013, Robson gained much praise by defeating Petra Kvitová in the second round Australian Open 11–9 in the deciding set, in a marathon match. At Madrid, Robson gained the first top four victory of her career, upsetting world No. 4, Agnieszka Radwańska, in the second round in straight sets, losing just four games. She subsequently lost to former world No. 1, Ana Ivanovic, in the following round, after having led 5–2 in the final set.
At Wimbledon, she reached the fourth round as the home favorite, coming back from 1–6, 2–5 down to win her third-round match. At the US Open, Robson was seeded at a Grand Slam event for the first time, at 30.

Over the course of her career, Robson has claimed one ITF title. On the ITF Junior Circuit, she won Wimbledon in 2008 and was runner-up at the Australian Open in both 2009 and 2010.

Singles performance timeline
Only main-draw results in WTA Tour, Grand Slam tournaments, Fed Cup and Olympic Games are included in win–loss records.

Olympic finals

Mixed doubles: 1 (silver medal)

WTA career finals

Singles: 1 (runner-up)

Doubles: 2 (2 runner-ups)

ITF Circuit finals

Singles: 4 (3 titles, 1 runner–up)

Doubles: 9 (4 titles, 5 runner–ups)

ITF junior finals

Grand Slam finals

Singles: 3 (1 titles, 2 runner-ups)

Fed Cup participation
Great Britain Fed Cup team

Singles: 6 (4–2)

Doubles: 10 (9–1)

Top-10 wins per season

See also
 List of Grand Slam Women's Singles champions
 WTA Tour records

Notes

References

External links
 
 
 

Tennis career statistics